Robert de Beaumont, 1st Earl of Leicester, Count of Meulan ( – 5 June 1118), also known as Robert of Meulan, was a powerful Norman nobleman, one of the very few proven Companions of William the Conqueror during the Norman Conquest of England in 1066, and was revered as one of the wisest men of his age. Chroniclers spoke highly of his eloquence and his learning, and three kings of England valued his counsel. He was granted immense land-holdings in England (mainly in the Midlands) by William the Conqueror and by Henry I and was created Earl of Leicester.

Biography
Robert was born between 1040 and 1050, the eldest son of Roger de Beaumont (1015–1094) by his wife Adeline of Meulan (died 1081), the daughter of Waleran III, Count de Meulan and Adelais. He was one of the 15 proven Companions of William the Conqueror specifically referred to in surviving documents as having fought at the Battle of Hastings in 1066 under William the Conqueror, Duke of Normandy, who was his cousin. He served as leader of the infantry on the right wing of the Norman army, as evidenced in the following near contemporary account by William of Poitiers:
'A certain Norman, Robert, son of Roger of Beaumont, being nephew and heir to Henry, Count of Meulan, through Henry's sister Adeline, found himself that day in battle for the first time. He was as yet but a young man and he performed feats of valour worthy of perpetual remembrance. At the head of a troop which he commanded on the right wing he attacked with the utmost bravery and success".
His service earned him the grant of more than 91 English manors confiscated from the defeated English, as listed in the Domesday Book of 1086.

When his mother died in 1081, Robert inherited the title of Count of Meulan in Normandy, and the title Viscount Ivry and Lord of Norton. He paid homage to King Philip I of France for these estates and sat as a French Peer in the Parliament held at Poissy.

Robert and his brother Henry were members of the Royal hunting party in the New Forest in Hampshire when King William II Rufus (1087–1100) was shot dead accidentally by an arrow on 2 August 1100. He pledged allegiance to William II's brother, King Henry I (1100–1135), who created him Earl of Leicester in 1107.

On the death of William Rufus, William, Count of Évreux and Ralph de Conches made an incursion into Robert's Norman estates, on the pretence they had suffered injury through some advice that Robert had given to the king; their raid was successful and they collected a vast booty.

During the English phase of the Investiture Controversy, he was excommunicated by Pope Paschal II on 26 March 1105 for advising King Henry to continue selecting the bishops of his realm in opposition to the canons of the church. Sometime in 1106, Henry succeeded in having Anselm, the exiled archbishop of Canterbury, revoke this excommunication. Anselm's (somewhat presumptuous) act was ultimately ratified by Paschal.

According to Henry of Huntingdon, Robert died of shame after "a certain earl carried off the lady he had espoused, either by some intrigue or by force and stratagem." He was the last surviving Norman nobleman to have fought in the Battle of Hastings.

Robert de Beaumont was buried at the Abbey of Saint-Pierre de Préaux in Normandy.

Family
In 1096, he married  Elizabeth (or Isabel) de Vermandois, daughter of Hugh Magnus (1053–1101) and Adelaide, Countess of Vermandois (1050–1120). After his death Elizabeth remarried in 1118 to William de Warenne, 2nd Earl of Surrey. He had the following progeny:

Waleran IV de Beaumont, Count of Meulan, 1st Earl of Worcester (b. 1104), eldest twin and heir.
Robert de Beaumont, 2nd Earl of Leicester & Earl of Hereford (b. 1104), twin
Hugh de Beaumont, 1st Earl of Bedford (born )
 Emma de Beaumont (born 1102)
 Adeline de Beaumont, married Hugh de Montfort-sur-Risle;, then Richard de Granville of Bideford (died 1147)
 Aubree de Beaumont, married Hugh II of Châteauneuf-Thimerais
 Agnes de Beaumont, a nun
 Maud de Beaumont, married William Lovel
 Isabel de Beaumont, a mistress of King Henry I, married Gilbert de Clare, 1st Earl of Pembroke, and then Hervé de Montmorency, Constable of Ireland

In popular culture

Television
Robert De Beaumont is portrayed by Jotham Annan in the 3 part BBC drama-documentary presented by Dan Snow, 1066: A Year to Conquer England.

Notes

Sources

Edward T. Beaumont, The Beaumonts in History. A.D. 850-1850. Oxford.

References

External links
The Conqueror and His Companions: Robert de Beaumont

Leicester, Robert de Beaumont, 1st Earl of
Leicester, Robert de Beaumont, 1st Earl of
Leicester, Robert de Beaumont, 1st Earl of
Companions of William the Conqueror
Norman warriors
Counts of Meulan
Robert
1st Earl of Leicester

Year of birth uncertain

it:Roberto di Beaumont, II conte di Leicester